Sepsisoma flavescens is a species of fly in the family Richardiidae.

References

External links

 

Tephritoidea
Articles created by Qbugbot
Insects described in 1900